Benoit Doucet (born April 23, 1963) is a Canadian-German ice hockey coach and a former professional player.

He spent most of his professional playing career in Germany and represented the German Men's National Team at the 1994 and 1998 Olympic Games and three World Championships. He is currently the head coach of EV Moosburg in Germany.

Playing career 
Doucet played for the Hull Olympiques in the junior league QMJHL alongside John Chabot and Sylvain Turgeon and then spent the 1984-85 season at the Université de Moncton.

He went undrafted, but was invited to the Calgary Flames training camp in 1985 and made 79 AHL appearances for Calgary's affiliate Moncton Golden Flames in the 1985-86 season. Doucet never landed a spot on the Flames' NHL roster and after competing in the Canadian National Team system in 1986-87, he left North America to pursue a career in Europe. This proved to be a decision that he would never regret, Doucet said years later.

He spent his first two years in Germany in the country's second division with Duisburger SC and ECD Sauerland, displaying his scoring prowess: For Duisburg, Doucet registered 43 goals and 51 assists in 27 games through the 1988-89 season and then broke his own record the following season: He was virtually unstoppable as he totaled 67 goals and 60 assists in 33 games for the Iserlohn-based team.

Doucet's impact in Germany's second division led to strong interest from teams of the country's top-tier. He signed with EV Landshut in 1990 and continued his high-scoring ways in Germany's top division, tallying 45 goals and 42 assists in 43 contests.

Prior to the 1991-92 season, Doucet inked a contract with Düsseldorfer EG, the team that swept all before them in German ice hockey in the early 1990s. He won German championships with DEG in 92, 93 and 96 and played a total of 280 Bundesliga/DEL games for the Düsseldorf team, recording 136 goals and 198 assists. One of the great moments of his career came in game five of the 1993 finals between arch rivals DEG and Kölner Haie, when Doucet scored the game-winner in overtime to give Düsseldorf their fourth straight title.

Doucet retired in 1998, but made a brief comeback in 1998-99, playing six games for Kölner Haie and ten games for second-division side Grefrather EV. After winding down his playing career, he returned to his native Quebec.

International career 
Doucet received German citizenship in the early 90s. He played for the German Men's National Team at the 1994 and 1998 Olympic Games, attended three World Championships and the 1996 World Cup of Hockey.

Coaching career 
He worked as a coach at hockey academies in Canada and was named head coach of German DEL2 side Fischtown Pinguins on June 3, 2015. He was sacked by the Pinguins on January 25, 2016 despite sitting in second place in the DEL2. In 2020, he took over the coaching job at ESV Waldkirchen in the German minor league Landesliga. In June 2022, Doucet was named head coach of German Landesliga side EV Moosburg.

Career statistics

Regular season and playoffs

International

References

External links 

1963 births
Düsseldorfer EG players
ECD Sauderland players
EHC Olten players
EV Landshut players
Füchse Duisburg players
German ice hockey centres
Hull Olympiques players
Canadian ice hockey coaches
Ice hockey players at the 1994 Winter Olympics
Ice hockey players at the 1998 Winter Olympics
Iserlohn Roosters players
Kölner Haie players
Living people
Moncton Golden Flames players
Olympic ice hockey players of Germany
Ice hockey people from Montreal
Université de Moncton alumni
Canadian expatriate ice hockey players in Switzerland
Canadian expatriate ice hockey players in Germany
Naturalized citizens of Germany
Canadian expatriate ice hockey players in West Germany
German ice hockey coaches